General elections were held in Singapore on 21 September 1963. The elections saw the Malaysian ruling party, United Malays National Organisation (UMNO), backed with Singapore Alliance Party (SAP) in an attempt to oust the People's Action Party (PAP), after violating previous agreement not to do so and a highlight in the relations between UMNO and the PAP. However, the result was a victory for the PAP, which won 37 of the 51 seats in the Singapore Legislative Assembly. The Alliance, which broke its agreement not to contest the election, saw it losing all its 7 seats which it held prior (including that of the SPA) to the election. Their participation in the election, in violation of the agreement between the two parties, would prompt the PAP to contest the next federal election held in Peninsula Malaysia the 1964, further adding to more tension between the two ruling parties. The 1963 election was the only election to date with no boundary changes to any of the 51 existing constituencies.

As Singapore would gain independence in 1965, this election was the only election that was held as a state of Malaysia. After independence, the elected members of the Legislative Assembly would then become Members of the inaugural Parliament of Singapore.

A total of 210 candidates contested this election – making it the largest slate of candidates to contest ever in Singapore's history. The ruling PAP – 51 candidates, its breakaway parties BS – 46 candidates and UPP – 46 candidates and the Alliance, the Singapore branch of the Malaysian federal ruling coalition – 42 candidates all vied to form the next government. This also marked the last time that any other party than the PAP would field candidates in more than half the total parliamentary seats. With two breakaway factions of the PAP fielding nearly full slate of candidates, this was the most hard fought election in Singapore's history and particulary for the ruling PAP.

The elections would be the last until 2015 in which all seats were contested. Further, the 1963 election would also be the last time until 2020 where the ruling PAP would lose the popular vote in areas contested by the opposition (when the Worker's Party would poll 50.49% to PAP's 49.51%) and the only election in Singapore's history where the PAP would poll less than 50% of the nationwide popular vote.

With PAP winning a near three-quarters majority with just under 47% of the national vote, this is the lowest ever super-majority government formed to date in Singapore's history.

Background
Although the People's Action Party (PAP) had won 43 seats in the 1959 elections, they lost four seats in 1961 (two were from the by-election defeats, and two defected to the new United People's Party (UPP)). A further 13 legislators were expelled from PAP for voting against the government in a no-confidence motion on 20 July 1961; the dissidents subsequently formed a new party, the Barisan Sosialis (BS), alleging PAP as a communist front. The combination of by-election defeats, defections and expulsions reduced the PAP by 17 seats down to 26, leaving PAP with a one-seat majority.

On 3 July 1962, while the integration referendum debate was in procession, thePAP lost its majority following the resignation of legislator Ho Puay Choo (who later joined BS on 11 August). Five days later, UPP legislator S. V. Lingam returned to PAP fold, giving it back its one-seat majority. However, the PAP lost its majority again five days later after health minister Ahmad Ibrahim died from liver cancer. BS initially planned to field its iconic leader, Lim Chin Siong, in the vacated seat, but the Prime Minister Lee Kuan Yew opted against a by-election, and instead called a fresh election.

On 31 August 1963, Singapore was declared independent from the United Kingdom with PAP declared as trustees until the merger with Malaysia could be complete. On 3 September, Lee dissolved the Legislative Assembly in accordance with procedure, and called for elections to be held on 21 September.

Timeline

Campaign
The elections, held in the midst of Singapore's merger with Malaysia, are remembered as the PAP's hardest-fought as the party faced intensive challenges from three other parties that fielded nearly full slates. BS collated with Parti Rakyat, and fielded candidates in all but two seats, while UPP had an unusually large number of candidates. The PAP government launched Operation Coldstore on 2 February 1963 and detained several BS leaders, including Lim.

On the final night of campaigning, PAP officials warned that should BS win the election and defeat PAP, the Malaysia Federal government could send troops into Singapore to invoke emergency powers in place of the incoming government led by the new pro-communist party, leaving no opportunity for BS to respond. This was said to have accounted for the eventual victory of the PAP the following day.

The sole Workers' Party (WP) legislator David Marshall resigned from the party he founded and became the only independent. Another participant was Singapore Alliance, an extension of the ruling federal Alliance Party in Malaysia, which was a coalition consisting of the Singapore People's Alliance (SPA) along with the local branches of UMNO, the Malayan Chinese Association and Malayan Indian Congress. However, former Chief Minister and leader Lim Yew Hock opted not to run in the elections, citing a defamation campaign by the PAP.

Results

The PAP won a landslide victory, securing a two-thirds majority, an outcome that had been in doubt or unexpected in the lead-up to the vote. However, the party's vote share was its lowest-ever at just under 47%. Despite the BS and UPP winning a combined 14 seats, both parties failed to win most of the seats they contested, due to the split of the anti-PAP vote. A total of 92 candidates lost their deposits.

The Singapore Alliance lost all seven seats it had held before dissolution, losing even in core support areas such as Malay constituencies Kampong Kembangan, Geylang Serai and Southern Islands.

Nine incumbent members failed to be re-elected, among which the defeats of Kenneth Michael Byrne and Tan Kia Gan (in the seats of Crawford and Paya Lebar, respectively) marked the first time a higher-ranked PAP cabinet minister had been defeated in their constituencies. This would not happen again until the 2011 elections, 48 years and 11 elections later, where cabinet ministers Lim Hwee Hua and George Yeo were defeated in his constituency of Aljunied.

By constituency

Aftermath

Many cited factors that led to the PAP victory include: 
 The PAP's eleventh hour warning to voters that Malaysia would send troops into Singapore and invoke emergency powers in place of the incoming Barisan government;
 A strong support among voters for Singapore's merger with Malaya, which was perceived to be jeopardised should Barisan win the election due to its opposition to merger; 
 English-educated middle classes fearful of communism tactically voting for PAP following the split of the leftists away from the party. 
 Barisan's support for Indonesia and the Communist Party of Indonesia's opposition to the formation of Malaysia, especially when Indonesia had declared Konfrontasi and begun provocative military manoeuvres in Borneo in the lead up to the election;
 Policies introduced by the government such as building of 26,000 Housing and Development Board flats, reduction in unemployment rate and investment in public services from 1959 to 1963.

To discourage future defections, the PAP government passed a constitutional amendment stipulating that legislators who resign or are expelled from the parties they were elected under would lose their seats. As a result, by-elections were subsequently held in Hong Lim in 1965, seven constituencies in 1966 and five constituencies in 1967. Those victories resulted PAP in achieving a parliament monopoly that would last for the next 15 years until the first elected opposition MP in 1981.

The distribution of 15 Singapore seats in Malaysia's lower house of Parliament (Dewan Rakyat) was based on the outcome of the election. PAP was allocated 12, which were given to Prime Minister Lee, Deputy Prime Minister Toh Chin Chye, ministers Goh Keng Swee, Ong Pang Boon, S. Rajaratnam, Yong Nyuk Lin, Jek Yeun Thong, Lim Kim San, Othman Wok and assembly members Abdul Rahim Ishak, Wee Toon Boon and Ho See Beng. BS was allocated 3: Chia Thye Poh, Lim Huan Boon and Kow Kee Seng.

See also

List of Singaporean electoral divisions (1963–68)

References

Singapore
State elections in Malaysia
 
General elections in Singapore
Singapore in Malaysia